Group B of the 2003 Fed Cup Americas Zone Group I was one of two pools in the Americas Zone Group I of the 2003 Fed Cup. Four teams competed in a round robin competition, with the top teams coming first and second advancing to the play-offs, and the bottom team being relegated down to 2003 Group II.

Brazil vs. Paraguay

Cuba vs. El Salvador

Brazil vs. El Salvador

Cuba vs. Paraguay

Brazil vs. Cuba

Paraguay vs. El Salvador

  failed to win any ties in the pool, and thus was relegated to Group II in 2004, where they placed equal first and thus advanced back up to Group I for 2005.

See also
Fed Cup structure

References

External links
 Fed Cup website

2003 Fed Cup Americas Zone